Alfred Klug (June 1, 1920 – June 14, 1957) was a professional American football tackle and guard in the All-America Football Conference. He played for the Buffalo Bisons (1946) and the Baltimore Colts (1947–1948) as a tackle and guard. He played at the collegiate level at Marquette University.

References

1920 births
1957 deaths
Players of American football from Milwaukee
American football tackles
American football guards
Marquette Golden Avalanche football players
Baltimore Colts (1947–1950) players
Buffalo Bisons (AAFC) players